The Loud House is an American animated television series created by Chris Savino that premiered on Nickelodeon on May 2, 2016. The series revolves around the chaotic everyday life of a boy named Lincoln Loud, who is the middle child and only son in a large family of 11 children. It is set in a fictional town in southeastern Michigan called Royal Woods, based on Savino's hometown of Royal Oak. The series was pitched to the network in 2013 as a two-minute short film entered in the annual Animated Shorts Program. It entered production the following year. The series is based on Savino's own childhood growing up in a large family, and its animation is largely influenced by newspaper comic strips.

Since its debut, the series has gained high ratings, becoming the top-rated children's animated series on American television within its first month on the air. The series has received considerable media attention and nominations at both the 28th and the 29th GLAAD Media Awards for its inclusion of Howard and Harold McBride, two supporting characters who are an interracial gay married couple. Their introduction into the series was reported in the news as being historic and caused a ratings surge. In May 2017, the characters of Lincoln Loud and Clyde McBride were featured on the front cover of Variety as an example of diverse characters in children's television.

As of March 2022, six seasons of the series have been broadcast, along with a renewal for a seventh season. The series has spawned a multimedia franchise, including the spin-off series The Casagrandes, which aired from October 2019 to September 2022, an animated feature film that was released on Netflix in August 2021, a live-action television film that premiered in November 2021, and live-action series The Really Loud House that premiered in November 2022.

Premise

Lincoln Loud is the only boy and the middle child in a family of eleven children residing in the fictional town of Royal Woods, Michigan. He has ten sisters with distinctive personalities consisting of bossy eldest child Lori, ditzy fashionista Leni, musician Luna, comedian Luan, athletic Lynn Jr., gloomy poetic goth Lucy, polar opposite twins Lana and Lola, child genius Lisa, and baby Lily. Lincoln occasionally breaks the fourth wall to explain to the viewers the chaotic conditions and sibling relationships of the household, and continually devises plans to make his life in the Loud House better.

In the fifth season, the Loud siblings aged up a year with Lori going to Fairway University, Lincoln going to middle school, and Lily going to preschool.

Episodes

Production

Development
The Loud House was created by Chris Savino for Nickelodeon. Savino based the series on his own experiences growing up in a large family. Early in development, the Loud family was going to be composed of rabbits, but this was terminated when an executive, Jenna Boyd, asked Savino to make them human. The idea of the Loud family being rabbits became used as Lincoln's dream in the Season 3 episode "White Hare". He pitched the idea to Nickelodeon in 2013 as a -minute short for their annual Animated Shorts Program. In June 2014, Nickelodeon announced that The Loud House had been picked up for a season of 13 episodes. The episode order was later increased to 26. On May 25, 2016, Nickelodeon announced that the series had been picked up for a second season of 14 episodes later increased to 26. On October 19, 2016, the series had been picked up for a third season of 26 episodes. Savino has cited Peanuts and Polly and Her Pals as influences on the show's characterizations and animation. Newspaper comic strips are also influences on the show's background art.

Episodes are produced at Nickelodeon Animation Studio in Burbank, California, USA and animated by Canadian studio Jam Filled Entertainment.

Savino's firing
On October 17, 2017, Cartoon Brew reported that Chris Savino was suspended from the studio due to allegations of sexual harassment, the report noting that rumors of Savino's behavior have existed for "at least a decade." On October 19, a Nickelodeon spokesperson confirmed that Savino had been fired from the studio, and that the series will continue production without him. Six days later on October 23, Savino spoke for the first time since his firing saying he said he was "deeply sorry" for his actions. Alongside the announcement of the series being greenlit for a fourth season, it was revealed that story editor Michael Rubiner had now been named executive producer and showrunner. On May 30, 2018, Savino was suspended from The Animation Guild, IATSE Local 839, for one year.

Broadcast
The series debuted on Nickelodeon on May 2, 2016, with new episodes premiering every weekday that month. The first trailer for the series premiered on March 13, 2016. The series also aired on AFN Family.

Internationally, the series premiered in Israel and Italy on May 15. It premiered in Latin America, Brazil, Poland, Germany, France and Africa the following day. It began airing in Southeast Asia on May 20. Australia, New Zealand, the United Kingdom and Ireland's Nickelodeon channels premiered the series on May 30. In Canada, YTV aired a sneak peek of the series on September 5, 2016, which was followed by an official premiere on September 6, 2016.

The series premiered on May 15, 2016, in the Middle East and North Africa on Nickelodeon, dubbed in Gulf Arabic.

In India, the series premiered on Nick HD+ on May 18, 2020.

Home media

Reception

Critical
The Loud House has received positive reviews, specifically for its animation, voice acting, characterization, and the heartwarming themes of each episode. Emily Ashby of Common Sense Media praised the show's voice cast and thematic messages, writing that "kids will come to The Loud House for the laughs, but they'll return for the ensemble cast and the surprisingly heartwarming themes that dominate every story." Kevin Johnson of The A.V. Club gave the series a B+, noting that "the female characters are defined by their traits, but never judged for them."

It attracted negative attention from some fans and critics later on for its heavy amount of spin-offs and merchandising. Ryan Lewis of CBR.com wrote that "Nickelodeon tried too hard to match SpongeBob'''s influence and immediately took to creating spin-offs, a Netflix movie, and countless merchandise. These efforts may have been justified had The Loud House not been written with one-note stock characters making up its main cast."

LGBTQIA+ representation
The characters of Howard and Harold McBride have received praise for being a positive representation of an interracial gay married couple. They are the first married gay couple to be featured in a Nicktoon. Laura Bradley of Vanity Fair stated that The Loud House "handles the topic [of same-sex marriage] in exactly the right way...this kind of casual representation in children's programming is a milestone." De Elizabeth of Teen Vogue wrote, "The best part is that the show doesn't treat these characters any differently, or even introduce them with a heavy asterisk about their marital status." The Friskys Tai Gooden mentioned that "kids who have two dads (or moms) will be more than thrilled to see a family they can identify with on TV." Time reported that "people are thrilled about Nickelodeon's decision" to include a gay couple. Some conservative groups, by contrast, have criticized the introduction of the characters. The One Million Moms division of the American Family Association objected to scenes featuring the McBride parents and unsuccessfully pushed for the episode in which they first appeared to be edited to exclude the couple, saying that "Nickelodeon should stick to entertaining instead of pushing an agenda." The Kenya Film Classification Board also called for the suspension of the series on pay television service DStv, saying that the animated series "promotes the Lesbian, Gay and Transgender agenda."

RatingsThe Loud House became the number-one children's animated series on television within its first month on the air. Throughout May 2016, it received an average of 68% more viewers in its target audience of children aged 6–11 than broadcasts on Nickelodeon in May of the previous year. As of June 2016, it was Nickelodeon's highest-rated program, beating SpongeBob SquarePants with an average Nielsen rating of 4.9 among the 2–11 demographic at the time.The Los Angeles Times cited The Loud House as a major factor in maintaining Nickelodeon's position as the highest-rated children's network in summer 2016. During the show's fourth week of premieres, Cyma Zarghami announced that it was continuing to draw more viewers than any other program on the channel.

The show's highest-rated episode, with 2.28 million viewers upon its premiere, is "Two Boys and a Baby". This was the first episode to air after it was announced that Howard and Harold McBride would be debuting on the program. The first episode of The Loud House shown at prime time, "11 Louds a Leapin'", was the seventh most-viewed telecast across all U.S. households on November 25, 2016.

Awards and nominationsThe Loud Houses portrayal of interracial gay married couple Howard and Harold McBride led the series to be nominated for Outstanding Individual Episode at the 28th GLAAD Media Awards and for Outstanding Kids & Family Programming at the 29th, 31st and 32nd GLAAD Media Awards. The series has also been nominated for Favorite Cartoon at the Kids' Choice Awards every year since 2017.

FranchiseThe Loud House has spawned a multimedia franchise, including several video game, graphic novel, and book series adaptations, the spin-off animated series The Casagrandes, which aired from October 2019 to September 2022, an animated feature film which was released on Netflix in August 2021, a live-action television film pilot that premiered in November 2021, and live-action series, The Really Loud House, that premiered in November 2022.

Graphic novel series
The series has spawned a graphic novel series by publisher Papercutz. The graphic novels are by either crew members or other incoming artists, and dive into the world of the show and the characters within. They are usually anthology comics, however, others are arranged on certain themes, while others have overarching storylines. The first graphic novel, There Will Be Chaos, was released on May 9, 2017. There are currently two series, a running series and a special series focusing on the seasons and certain holidays.

Running series
List current as of March 2023.

Seasonal/holiday series

Chapter book series
The series has also produced a series of chapter books with original stories, initially published by Random House before switching to Scholastic.

Podcast
Listen Out Loud
Nickelodeon and its YouTube channel have done a series of podcasts called Listen Out Loud, where each member of the Loud family does a podcast revolving around their topics.

 "Meet the Loud Family" – The Loud siblings start their very first podcast, but they can't come up with a topic about it.
 Luna Loud – Luna and her roadie Chunk give the listeners a virtual tour of Luna's home music studio (which is actually her and Luan's bedroom) where Luna talks about her musical instruments and her inspirations, but some of her instruments keep disturbing Bud Grouse.
 Lola Loud – Lola does her podcast called "The Lowdown with Lola" where she starts dishing out the latest Loud family gossip much to the dismay of her siblings.
 Leni Loud – With help from Lincoln as her producer, Leni gives the listeners a virtual tour of the Royal Woods Mall, where she shows her favorite stores and the different shopkeepers that she knows.
 Luan Loud – Luan teaches her listeners the basics of playing pranks on anyone. She demonstrates a few on some of her siblings much to their annoyance. But little does Luan know that she might get pranked right back.
 Lori Loud – With Bobby on her phone helping out from Great Lakes City and Luna providing musical accompaniment, he and Lori talk about how they first met and eventually started dating. However, they over-romanticize the details on their first date so Luan and Lynn Jr. chime in and tell them what really happened and how they had spied on them during the date to make sure that Bobby was good for Lori.
 Lincoln Loud – Lincoln and Clyde give the listeners a virtual tour of their treehouse. When their hammock goes missing, Lincoln and Clyde become Ace Savvy and One-Eyed Jack to find out who stole it. While Lincoln suspects that it's one of his sisters, they soon discover that the culprit is someone they'd least suspect.
 Lynn Loud Jr. – Lynn Jr. leads the listeners in her own at-home workout, arguing that gym memberships are expensive and mentioning how some gyms tend to ban people from bringing spicy submarine sandwiches into the sauna. During every single part of the workout, Lynn causes fitness-type chaos in the house which annoys her family.
 Lana Loud – Lana teaches the listeners how to handle and take care of vehicles. Using the family van Vanzilla as an example, Lana gets some more help from her faithful frog Hops, her parents (Lynn Sr. and Rita), and two of her sisters, Lori and Leni, as they are the ones who drive Vanzilla.
 Lucy Loud – Lucy talks about the five main features of the Royal Woods Cemetery with the help of Lincoln since Luan was unavailable. Though they soon find evidence that there is a ghost in the area.
 Rita Loud – Rita discusses what she does at her dentist job as she runs the dental office while Dr. Feinstein is away at Cavity Con. While she does the dental work on Lola, Lori, and a reluctant Lynn Loud Sr., Rita also has to deal with some malfunctioning equipment which leads to her calling Lana in to take care of them.
 Lisa Loud – Lisa takes a break from solving her family's problems so that she can use her brainpower to solve the greater challenges of humankind by hosting a call-in called "Ask a Brainiac". Though the people who call her up are Lynn Loud Sr., Luan, Rita, Lincoln, and Lynn with their respectful questions.
 Lincoln & Clyde Review Gus' Games & Grub - Lincoln and Clyde work to review Gus's Games & Grub only to find it crowded. While working on reviewing the games, they have a hard time trying to get a table due to the different actions done by Lynn and Chandler.
 Lola Loud's Pageant Tips - With the aid of her pageant coach Lincoln, Lola gives pageant tips to the listeners while preparing for the Little Miss Iron Ore pageant that Cheryl is helping out with. When Lola's ribbon for her ribbon dance routine goes missing, Lincoln works to find it as Lola suspects that Lindsey Sweetwater is responsible.
 Lucy and the Morticians Club - Lucy and the Morticians Club (consisting of Haiku, Persephone, Boris, Dante, and Morpheus) hold a séance to speak to Royal Woods Elementary School's mascot Ricky the Rooster. They try to hold it at different locations like the Royal Woods Cemetery where the groundskeeper Hank is dealing with owls, Lucy's home where the antics of Lynn and Lana disrupt it, and Boris's house where his home decorating mother tries to treat them. When it comes to attempting a séance at Royal Woods Elementary School, Principal Huggins allows it since he still misses Ricky.
 Clyde's Explosive Cooking Problems - Clyde visits Lynn's Table to find out how to run a restaurant from Lynn Loud Sr. as Clyde works as his sous chef for the day. It becomes difficult for Clyde in the kitchen during the lunch rush as Kotaro mentions that it's the weekend of the Rattlesnake Roundup where some of the guests are from the Poconos. While also dealing with Scoots' demands, Clyde does some table service to Mr. Grouse and Flip.
 Lana Loud Rescues Animals - As mentioned two podcasts ago, Lana is volunteering at the Royal Woods Animal Shelter. She is assisted by Sam Sharp who is working as the head volunteer as Lana learns about its Adoption Day. They work to find pets for every one of its visitors like Rocket the German Pinscher, Feline Dion the tabby, and Captain Ron the cockatoo. While Sam goes to pick up lunch, Lana makes efforts to sell pets to possible adopters like Mayor Davis, Cheryl, and Dante.
 Luan Loud Teaches Comedy - Luan and Mr. Coconuts teach a comedy workshop at the Royal Woods Community Center, though Luan gets nervous when she finds that Benny is the co-teacher alongside his marionette, Mrs. Appleblossom. After setting up the classroom, Luan and Benny get Leni, Flip, Boris, and Mrs. Bernardo who arrived on a horse named Hamlet after finishing her directing debut for Sunset Canyon's afternoon dinner theater. Mr. Coconuts makes comments towards the students that cause them to leave one by one.

Films
Feature film

On March 28, 2017, Paramount Pictures' president Marc Evans announced a film based on the series, that was originally set for a February 7, 2020 theatrical release. However, in January 2019, Paramount removed the film from their schedule for unknown reasons. On February 5, 2019, it was announced that the film would instead be produced for a release on Netflix. On January 12, 2021, it was reconfirmed that the film would release on Netflix within the same year, with the film's plot focusing on the Loud family traveling to Scotland, where they discover that they are part of Scottish royalty. In April 2021, it was revealed that the film would be released in summer 2021. On June 10, 2021, Netflix announced the film would be released on August 20, 2021.

Television film

A live-action film based on the series, titled A Loud House Christmas, premiered on Nickelodeon on November 26, 2021. The film was first announced on February 19, 2020, originally titled The Loud House: A Very Loud Christmas!, and was set to premiere in late 2020. The film depicts Lincoln and Clyde working to preserve the Christmas traditions when the Loud sisters plan to have their Christmas plans elsewhere. Filming took place in Atlanta in mid-2021.

On March 18, 2021, it was announced that Wolfgang Schaeffer and Jahzir Bruno were cast as Lincoln and Clyde, respectively. On August 23, 2021, other cast members of the film were announced, including Lexi Janicek as Lisa, Ella and Mia Allan as Lola and Lana, Aubin Bradley as Lucy, Morgan McGill as Lynn, Catherine Ashmore Bradley as Luan, Sophia Woodward as Luna, Dora Dolphin as Leni, Lexi DiBenedetto as Lori, Charlotte Ann Tucker as Lily, Brian Stepanek reprising his regular series voice role as Lynn Loud Sr., and Muretta Moss as Rita Loud. It premiered on November 26, 2021, on both Nickelodeon and Paramount+.

Spin-off

A spin-off, entitled The Casagrandes, was put into development by Nickelodeon in March 2018. It features Bobby and Ronnie Anne Santiago as well as their extended Casagrande family living in Great Lakes City. On May 7, 2019, it was revealed that Eugenio Derbez, Ken Jeong, and Melissa Joan Hart had joined the cast as Bobby and Ronnie Anne's father Dr. Arturo Santiago and new neighbors Stanley and Rebecca Chang, respectively. The series premiered on October 14, 2019. On February 17, 2022, the series was reported to be cancelled, with its characters set to make more appearances in The Loud House. The series concluded September 30, 2022.

Live-action series

On March 24, 2022, a live-action series of The Loud House was originally announced for Paramount+. The main cast members of A Loud House Christmas reprise their roles for the series, including Wolfgang Schaeffer as Lincoln and Jahzir Bruno as Clyde. Filming for the series began in Albuquerque, New Mexico in June 2022. In September 2022, it was announced that the series, entitled The Really Loud House, would premiere on Nickelodeon in November 2022. On October 5, 2022, it was announced that the series would premiere on November 3, 2022.

Games
A mobile game based on the series called The Loud House: Ultimate Treehouse was released on September 20, 2018, for iOS and Android. The Loud House: Outta Control was released on Apple Arcade on February 14, 2020. In the game, the siblings try to get through to their goals without running into each other.

Lincoln, Lucy, and Clyde appear as playable characters, with the rest of Lincoln's sisters appearing as unlockable pit crew characters, in the 2020 racing video game Nickelodeon Kart Racers 2: Grand Prix. Lincoln, Lucy and Clyde are confirmed to return in the 2022 sequel Nickelodeon Kart Racers 3: Slime Speedway, with Bentley Griffin, Jessica DiCicco, and Jahzir Bruno reprising their roles from the show.

Lincoln and Lucy are also playable in the 2021 title Nickelodeon All-Star Brawl''; a patch to the game added voice acting with their roles being reprised by Bentley Griffin and Jessica DiCicco.

References

External links

 
 
 Official Tumblr
 Official Instagram
 

 
2016 American television series debuts
2010s American animated television series
2010s American children's comedy television series
2010s American LGBT-related animated television series
2010s American LGBT-related comedy television series
2010s Nickelodeon original programming
2020s American animated television series
2020s American children's comedy television series
2020s American LGBT-related animated television series
2020s American LGBT-related comedy television series
2020s Nickelodeon original programming
American children's animated comedy television series
English-language television shows
Nickelodeon original programming
Nicktoons
Animated television series about children
Animated television series about families
Television shows set in Michigan
Elementary school television series
Bisexuality-related television series
Television series by Jam Filled Entertainment
Television shows about the COVID-19 pandemic